The Joyboard is a balance board peripheral for the Atari 2600 home video game console. It was released in 1982 and was used by standing on top of it and leaning in a certain direction. Skier Suzy Chaffee appeared on television and at toy fairs demonstrating its use.

Design
The Joyboard worked by installing the four directional latches of a joystick on the bottom of the board. Leaning in a certain direction engaged these latches, controlling the game. A joystick could also be connected to the Joyboard if necessary. This is done via a standard Atari joystick port placed next to where the cable goes into the board. It can be used in a "plugthrough" manner which saves disconnecting the board when not in use.

Due to similarities in design and function, the Wii Balance Board, a peripheral for Nintendo's Wii video game console, has been compared to the Joyboard. The Wii Balance Board also allows users to control games with their feet, but uses more advanced technology in the form of pressure sensors under each foot.

Software
Mogul Maniac was the only game released for the Joyboard. A slalom skiing game, it was developed by Amiga Corporation and sold alongside the Joyboard upon release. Off Your Rocker, another game developed by Amiga, could also use the Joyboard, in place of a normal joystick. The object of the game was to repeat the color and sound patterns made by "Rockin' Rollie", the on-screen character. Although the game was completed, it was never officially sold by Amiga, and instead the cartridges were sent to a company called Pleasant Valley Video who then sold them to the public. Surf's Up, a surfing game, was the first game developed for use with the Joyboard, but was not released either.

Guru Meditation

Early in the development of the Amiga computer operating system, the company's developers became so frustrated with the system's frequent crashes that, as a relaxation technique, they attempted to sit perfectly still on the Joyboard so not to engage any of the latches on the bottom of it. This is where the infamous Guru Meditation error originates from in earlier versions of the AmigaOS operating system.

In homage to this, Ian Bogost, founder of video game developer Persuasive Games, has developed the video game Guru Meditation in an attempt "to create a legitimate zen meditation game". Although the game may be played using a joystick, if a player uses the Joyboard, they must sit perfectly still on it with their legs crossed. If a player is successful, the on-screen yogi will rise, and once enough time has passed the yogi will begin to float and the timer starts. The time of day changes roughly each hour, and clouds pass in the background. Ian Bogost worked in conjunction with Atari fansite AtariAge to manufacture ten copies of the game in cartridge form.

References

External links

 The Joyboard at AtariAge
 Joyboard Pics

Amiga
Game controllers